Tareq wa Shireen is one of the first 2D animated series produced exclusively in Arabic with implications towards promoting Arabic heritage, history, culture and music. Intended for pre-school and junior children, the series provides an early development tool to educating youngsters in an entertaining fashion.
The series is currently only available as a DVD purchase.

Plot 
The series is organized into thirteen themes covering a range of educational topics from learning the Arabic language to health and exercise, each theme is further divided into five mini episodes covering each theme's different topics, and each of these mini episodes concludes with an easy-to-learn song that summarizes the information in the episode.

(2010)

Characters 
 Tareq
 Shireen
 Haidar
 Wessam
 Hussam
 Haifa

References

External links
 Rubicon Animation Studios' website
 Cartoon Network Arabia opens Dubai Hub
Cartoon Network Arabia to buy Arabic content

Jordanian animated television series
Jordanian children's television series
2006 Jordanian television series debuts
2000s Jordanian television series
2000s animated television series